Wiskott-Aldrich syndrome protein family member 3 is a protein that in humans is encoded by the WASF3 gene.

This gene encodes a member of the Wiskott-Aldrich syndrome protein family. The gene product is a protein that forms a multiprotein complex that links receptor kinases and actin. Binding to actin occurs through a C-terminal verprolin homology domain in all family members. The multiprotein complex serves to tranduce signals that involve changes in cell shape, motility or function.

References

Further reading